Ilmārs Rimšēvičs (born 30 April 1965) is a Latvian economist who served as the governor of the central Bank of Latvia from 2001 to 2019. In that position, he was also a member of the Governing Council of the European Central Bank.

Education
He studied engineering economics at the Riga University of Technology, graduating in 1990. He was a member of the student corporation Lettonia. His studies continued at Clarkson University in New York, completing a master's degree in business administration and management in 1992, whereafter he was appointed deputy governor and chairman of the board of the Bank of Latvia the same year.

Controversies

Rimšēvičs was detained by the Corruption Prevention and Combating Bureau on February 18, 2018, while officers raided his home and offices at the Bank of Latvia. He was released on bail the next day. State Prosecutor's office has charged Rimševičs with accepting a bribe. The case is pending.

Upon the end of this third term, Rimšēvičs was succeeded as governor by Mārtiņš Kazāks.

References

1965 births
Governors of the Bank of Latvia
Latvian economists
Living people
Businesspeople from Riga
Riga Technical University alumni
Recipients of the Order of the Cross of Terra Mariana, 2nd Class